Herbert William Ehrgott (October 31, 1904 – September 20, 1982) was a brigadier general in the United States Air Force.

Biography
Herbert William Ehrgott  was born in Milwaukee, Wisconsin, on October 31, 1904. He would attend the Massachusetts Institute of Technology.

Ehrgott died in Washington, D.C., on September 20, 1982, and was buried at Arlington National Cemetery.

Career
Ehrgott graduated from the United States Military Academy in 1926. In 1934 he became Professor of Military Science and Tactics at Alabama Polytechnic Institute. During World War II he served with the Ninth Air Force. Later he would work in atomic energy. His retirement was effective as of July 1, 1966.

Awards he received include the Legion of Merit, the Bronze Star Medal, the Croix de Guerre of France, and the Luxembourg War Cross. Ehrgott was also a Member of the Order of the British Empire.

References

Military personnel from Milwaukee
United States Air Force generals
Recipients of the Legion of Merit
Recipients of the Croix de Guerre (France)
Honorary Members of the Order of the British Empire
United States Army personnel of World War II
Auburn University faculty
United States Military Academy alumni
Massachusetts Institute of Technology alumni
1982 deaths
1904 births
Burials at Arlington National Cemetery